In mathematical group theory, a 3-transposition group is a group generated by a conjugacy class of involutions, called the 3-transpositions, such that the product of any two involutions from the conjugacy class has order at most 3. 

They were first studied by  who discovered the three Fischer groups as examples of 3-transposition groups.

History
 first studied 3-transposition groups in the special case when the product of any two distinct 3-transpositions has order 3. He showed that a finite group with this property is solvable, and has a (nilpotent) 3-group of index 2.  used these groups to construct examples of non-abelian CH-quasigroups and to describe the structure of commutative Moufang loops of exponent 3.

Fischer's theorem
Suppose that G is a group  that is generated by a conjugacy class D of 3-transpositions and such that the 2 and 3 cores O2(G) and O3(G) are both contained in the center Z(G) of G. Then  proved that up to isomorphism G/Z(G) is one of the following groups and D is the image of the given conjugacy class:
G/Z(G) is the trivial group.
G/Z(G) is a symmetric group Sn for n≥5, and D is the class of transpositions. (If n=6  there is a second class of 3-transpositions).
G/Z(G) is a symplectic group Sp2n(2) with n≥3 over the field of order 2, and D is the class of transvections. (When  n=2 there is a second class of transpositions.)
G/Z(G) is a projective special unitary group PSUn(2) with n≥5, and D is the class of transvections
G/Z(G) is an orthogonal group Oμ2n(2) with μ=±1 and n≥4, and D is the class of transvections
G/Z(G) is an index 2 subgroup POnμ,+(3) of the projective orthogonal group POnμ(3) (with μ=±1 and n≥5) generated by the class D of reflections of norm +1 vectors.
G/Z(G) is one of the three Fischer groups Fi22, Fi23, Fi24.
G/Z(G) is one of two groups of the form Ω8+(2).S3 and PΩ8+(3).S3, where Ω stands for the derived subgroup of the orthogonal group and S3 is the group of diagram automorphisms for the D4 Dynkin diagram.

The missing cases with n small above either do not satisfy the condition about 2 and 3 cores or have exceptional isomorphisms to other groups on the list.

Important examples

The group Sn has order n! and for n>1 has a subgroup An of index 2 that is simple if n>4.

The symmetric group Sn is a 3-transposition group for all n>1. The 3-transpositions are the elements that exchange two points, and leaving each of the remaining points fixed. These elements are the transpositions (in the usual sense) of Sn. (For n=6 there is a second class of 3-transpositions, namely the class of the elements of S6 which are products of 3 disjoint transpositions.)

The symplectic group Sp2n(2) has order

It is a 3-transposition group for all n≥1. It is simple if n>2, while for n=1 it is S3, and for n=2 it is S6 with a simple subgroup of index 2, namely A6. The 3-transpositions are of the form x↦x+(x,v)v for non-zero v.

The special unitary group SUn(2) has order

The projective special unitary group PSUn(2) is the quotient of the special unitary group SUn(2) by the subgroup M of all the scalar linear transformations in SUn(2). The subgroup M is the center of SUn(2). Also, M has order gcd(3,n).

The group PSUn(2) is simple if n>3, while for n=2 it is S3 and for n=3 it has the structure 32:Q8 (Q8 = quaternion group).

Both SUn(2) and PSUn(2) are 3-transposition groups for n=2 and for all n≥4. The 3-transpositions of SUn(2) for n=2 or n≥4 are of the form x↦x+(x,v)v for non-zero vectors v of zero norm. The 3-transpositions of PSUn(2) for n=2 or n≥4 are the images of the 3-transpositions of SUn(2) under the natural quotient map from SUn(2) to PSUn(2)=SUn(2)/M.

The orthogonal group O2n±(2) has order

(Over fields of characteristic 2, orthogonal group in odd dimensions are isomorphic to symplectic groups.) It has an index 2 subgroup (sometimes denoted by Ω2n±(2)), which is simple if n>2.

The group O2nμ(2) is a 3-transposition group for all n>2 and μ=±1. The 3-transpositions are of the form x↦x+(x,v)v for vectors v such that Q(v)=1, where Q is the underlying quadratic form for the orthogonal group.

The orthogonal groups On±(3) are the automorphism groups of quadratic forms Q over the field of 3 elements such that the discriminant of the bilinear form (a,b)=Q(a+b)−Q(a)−Q(b) is ±1. The group Onμ,σ(3), where μ and σ are signs, is the subgroup of Onμ(3) generated by reflections with respect to vectors v with Q(v)=+1 if σ is +, and is the subgroup of Onμ(3) generated by reflections with respect to vectors v with Q(v)=-1 if σ is −.

For μ=±1 and σ=±1, let POnμ,σ(3)=Onμ,σ(3)/Z, where Z is the group of all scalar linear transformations in Onμ,σ(3). If n>3, then Z is the center of Onμ,σ(3).

For μ=±1, let Ωnμ(3) be the derived subgroup of Onμ(3). Let PΩnμ(3)= Ωnμ(3)/X, where X is the group of all scalar linear transformations in Ωnμ(3). If n>2, then X is the center of Ωnμ(3).

If n=2m+1 is odd the two orthogonal groups On±(3) are isomorphic and have order

and  On+,+(3) ≅ On−,−(3) (center order 1 for n>3), and On−,+(3) ≅ On+,−(3) (center order 2 for n>3), because the two quadratic forms are scalar multiples of each other, up to linear equivalence.

If n=2m is even the two orthogonal groups On±(3) have orders

and On+,+(3) ≅ On+,−(3), and On−,+(3) ≅ On−,−(3), because the two classes of transpositions are exchanged by an element of the general orthogonal group that multiplies the quadratic form by a scalar. If n=2m, m>1 and m is even, then the centre of On+,+(3) ≅ On+,−(3) has order 2, and the centre of On−,+(3) ≅ On−,−(3) has order 1. If n=2m, m>2 and m is odd, then the centre of On+,+(3) ≅ On+,−(3) has order 1, and the centre of On−,+(3) ≅ On−,−(3) has order 2.

If n>3, and μ=±1 and σ=±1, the group Onμ,σ(3) is a 3-transposition group. The 3-transpositions of the group Onμ,σ(3) are of the form x↦x−(x,v)v/Q(v)=x+(x, v)/(v,v) for vectors v with Q(v)=σ, where Q is the underlying quadratic form of Onμ(3).

If n>4, and μ=±1 and σ=±1, then Onμ,σ(3) has index 2 in the orthogonal group Onμ(3). The group Onμ,σ(3) has a subgroup of index 2, namely Ωnμ(3), which is simple modulo their centers (which have orders 1 or 2). In other words, PΩnμ(3) is simple.

If n>4 is odd, and (μ,σ)=(+,+) or (−,−), then Onμ,+(3) and POnμ,+(3) are both isomorphic to SOnμ(3)=Ωnμ(3):2, where SOnμ(3) is the special orthogonal group of the underlying quadratic form Q. Also, Ωnμ(3) is isomorphic to PΩnμ(3), and is also non-abelian and simple.

If n>4 is odd, and (μ,σ)=(+,−) or (−,+), then Onμ,+(3) is isomorphic to Ωnμ(3)×2, and Onμ,+(3) is isomorphic to Ωnμ(3). Also, Ωnμ(3) is isomorphic to PΩnμ(3), and is also non-abelian and simple.

If n>5 is even, and μ=±1 and σ=±1, then Onμ,+(3) has the form Ωnμ(3):2, and POnμ,+(3) has the form PΩnμ(3):2. Also, PΩnμ(3) is non-abelian and simple.

Fi22 has order 217.39.52.7.11.13 = 64561751654400 and is simple.

Fi23 has order 218.313.52.7.11.13.17.23 = 4089470473293004800 and is simple.

Fi24 has order 222.316.52.73.11.13.17.23.29
and has a simple subgroup of index 2, namely Fi24'.

Isomorphisms and solvable cases

There are numerous degenerate (solvable) cases and isomorphisms between 3-transposition groups of small degree as follows :

Solvable groups

The following groups do not appear in the conclusion of Fisher's theorem as they are solvable (with order a power of 2 times a power of 3).

 has order 1.
 has order 2, and it is a 3-transposition group.
 is elementary abelian of order 4, and it is not a 3-transposition group.
 has order 6, and it is a 3-transposition group.
 is elementary abelian of order 8, and it is not a 3-transposition group.
 has order 24, and it is a 3-transposition group.
 has order 72, and it is not a 3-transposition group, where Q8 denotes the quaternion group.
 has order 72, and it is not a 3-transposition group.
 has order 216, and it is not a 3-transposition group, where 31+2 denotes the extraspecial group of order 27 and exponent 3, and Q8 denotes the quaternion group.
 has order 288, and it is not a 3-transposition group.
 has order 576, where * denotes the non-direct central product, and it is not a 3-transposition group.

Isomorphisms

There are several further isomorphisms involving groups in the conclusion of Fischer's theorem as follows. This list also identifies the Weyl groups of ADE Dynkin diagrams, which are all 3-transposition groups except W(D2)=22, with groups on Fischer's list (W stands for Weyl group).

 has order 120, and the group is a 3-transposition group.
 has order 720 (and 2 classes of 3-transpositions), and the group is a 3-transposition group.
 has order 40320, and the group is a 3-transposition group.
 has order 51840, and the group is a 3-transposition group.
 has order 25920, and the group is a 3-transposition group.
 has order 2903040, and the group is a 3-transposition group.
 has order 69672960, and the group is a 3-transposition group.
 for all s≥1, and the group is a 3-transposition group if s≥2.
 for all s≥1, and the group is a 3-transposition group for all s≥1.
 for all s≥0, and the group is a 3-transposition group for all s≥0.
 for all s≥0, and the group is a 3-transposition group if s≥1.
 for all m≥0, and the group is a 3-transposition group if m≥1.
 for all m≥0, and the group is a 3-transposition group if m=0 or m≥2.
 for all n≥1, and the group is a 3-transposition group for all n≥1.
 for all n≥2, and the group is a 3-transposition group if n≥3.

Proof

The idea of the proof is as follows. Suppose that D is the class of 3-transpositions in G, and d∈D, and let H be the subgroup generated by the set Dd of elements of D commuting with d. Then Dd is a set of 3-transpositions of H, so the 3-transposition groups can be classified by induction on the order by finding all possibilities for G given any 3-transposition group H. For simplicity assume that the derived group of G is perfect (this condition is satisfied by all but the two groups involving triality automorphisms.)

If O3(H) is not contained in Z(H) then G is the symmetric group S5
If H/Z(H) is of type Sn then either G is of type Sn+2 or n = 6 and G is of type O6−(2)
If H/Z(H) is of type Sp2n(2) with 2n ≥ 6 then G is of type O2n+2μ(2)
H/Z(H) cannot be of type O2nμ(2) for n ≥ 4.
If H/Z(H) is of type POnμ, π(3) for n>4 then G is of type POn+1−μπ, π(3).
If H/Z(H) is of type PSUn(2) for n ≥ 5 then n = 6 and G is of type Fi22 (and H is an exceptional double cover of PSU6(2))
If H/Z(H) is of type Fi22 then G is of type Fi23 and H is a double cover of Fi22.
If H/Z(H) is of type Fi23 then G is of type Fi24 and H is the product of Fi23 and a group of order 2.
H/Z(H) cannot be of type Fi24.

3-transpositions and graph theory
It is fruitful to treat 3-transpositions as vertices of a graph. Join the pairs that do not commute, i. e. have a product of order 3. The graph is connected unless the group has a direct product decomposition. The graphs corresponding to the smallest symmetric groups are familiar graphs. The 3 transpositions of S3 form a triangle. The 6 transpositions of S4 form an octahedron. The 10 transpositions of S5 form the complement of the Petersen graph.

The symmetric group Sn can be generated by n–1 transpositions: (1 2), (2 3), ..., (n−1 n) and the graph of this generating set is a straight line. It embodies sufficient relations to define the group Sn.

References

 contains a complete proof of Fischer's theorem.

 The first part of this preprint (4 of 19 sections) was published as  The later part with the construction of the Fischer groups is still unpublished (as of 2014).

Finite groups